Prakash G Apte was a professor at Indian Institute of Management Bangalore (IIM Bangalore). He is also a former Director of the institute. At IIM Bangalore, he has occupied the UTI Chair in Capital Market Studies since 1994. He has also taught at Columbia University, Katholieke Universiteit Leuven and EDHEC Business School. Currently, he teaches International Finance at NMIMS, Mumbai.

Select bibliography
 Apte (2006) "International Financial Management", Tata McGraw-Hill 
 Apte (2008) "International Finance: A Business Perspective", Tata McGraw-Hill

References

External links
Indian Institute of Management Bangalore - Faculty Information

Academic staff of the Indian Institute of Management Bangalore
Living people
Indian Institute of Management Calcutta alumni
IIT Bombay alumni
Year of birth missing (living people)
Kotak Mahindra Bank